Willis was a British automobile marque that began and ended in 1913. It was manufactured by Finchley Place Garage in London.

The only model was a cyclecar. The car had a V-twin engine from JA Prestwich Industries delivering .

Bibliography 
 Harald Linz & Halwart Schrader: Die Internationale Automobil-Enzyklopädie. United Soft Media Verlag GmbH, Munich 2008, 
 Nick Georgano: The Beaulieu Encyclopedia of the Automobile, Volume 3 P–Z. Fitzroy Dearborn Publishers, Chicago 2001,  (englisch)
 David Culshaw & Peter Horrobin: The Complete Catalogue of British Cars 1895-1975. Veloce Publishing plc. Dorchester (1997).

References 

Defunct motor vehicle manufacturers of England
Cyclecars
Motor vehicle manufacturers based in London
Defunct companies based in London